Bruce Noel Stevenson Fordyce (born 3 December 1955 in Hong Kong) is a South African marathon and ultramarathon athlete. He is best known for having won the South African Comrades Marathon a record nine times, of which eight wins were consecutive. He also won the London to Brighton Ultramarathon three years in a row. He is the former world record holder over 50 miles and the former world record holder over 100 km.

Early life and education
Born in Hong Kong to Evan Noel and Nancy Ann (Née Stevenson), Fordyce moved with his family to Johannesburg when he was 13 years old. He completed his school career at Woodmead High School and subsequently attended the University of the Witwatersrand, where he obtained his Bachelor of Arts degree in 1977 and his Honours Bachelor of Arts degree in 1979. During this time he was also a member of the university's anti-apartheid Student Representative Council as well as a committee member of the Wits Athletic Club. He married Gillian Leigh (Née Bruce)

Comrades Marathon
In 1977, when Fordyce first ran the Comrades Marathon, he placed 43rd out of 1,678 entries. He placed 14th in 1978, 3rd in 1979, 2nd in 1980, and was the winner for an unprecedented eight consecutive years from 1981 to 1988; he won it again in 1990. No other runner in the history of the Comrades has achieved this feat. Fordyce also held the record time for the "up" run (Durban to Pietermaritzburg) and his record of 5:24:07 for the "down" run (Pietermaritzburg to Durban) stood for 21 years from 1986 until it was broken in 2007 by Russia's Leonid Shvetsov.

He has thus completed 30 Comrades Marathons, including the remarkable result of posting identical times in 1985 and 1987.
In 2011 he aimed for a silver medal, but missed this by 31 seconds (finishing time of 7 hours 30 minutes 31 seconds).

London to Brighton Ultramarathon
Fordyce won the London to Brighton ultramarathon 3 years running from 1981 to 1983.

World record holder
Fordyce was the world record holder over 50 miles from 1983, when he covered the distance in 4hr 50min 51sec during the 53m 1082yds London to Brighton ultramarathon until the record was broken by Jim Walmsley on 5 May 2019. Fordyce holds the 50-mile record for the United States All Comers Race

Political activism 
Fordyce was strongly anti-apartheid. On his first victory race in 1981 he wore a black armband to protest against the 20th anniversary celebrations of the apartheid republic attracting boos and even some rotten tomatoes thrown by a fellow runner. Fordyce has claimed this protest as "one of the proudest moments in my life".

Books, journalism and motivational speaker
In addition to having written two books about the Comrades Marathon, Fordyce was also a sports columnist for various newspapers and magazines, and a SABC television commentator for the 2014 event. He is also a motivational speaker and the chief executive officer of the South African Sports Trust.

Fordyce also introduced the parkrun running events to South Africa. This is a collection of free-entry weekly 5k run events. There are now 158 parkrun events in South Africa as of 1 September 2018.

Other honours
In 2004, he was voted 64th in the Top 100 Great South Africans.

In 2007, he was awarded an honorary doctorate from the University of the Witwatersrand.

References

External links
South African Who's Who – Bruce Fordyce

1955 births
Living people
South African male marathon runners
South African ultramarathon runners
University of the Witwatersrand alumni
Male ultramarathon runners